Orstenotubulus is a genus of lobopodian known from Orsten deposits of the latest 'middle' Cambrian (Miaolingian). It is believed by some to be an ancestor of the Tardigrades.

Morphology

Orstenotubulus was a Mid Cambrian lobopodian. It had an elongated, thin body with pairs of dorsal spines running down the entire top of the body. It also had tiny retractable spines ventral to the leg surface. Orstenotubulus would have crawled along the sea floor like most other lobopodians, using its dorsal spines to deter any predators.

References

Lobopodia
Prehistoric protostome genera